South Mountain is an unincorporated community in Quincy Township in southeastern Franklin County, Pennsylvania, United States. South Mountain has a post office, with ZIP code 17261.

References

Unincorporated communities in Franklin County, Pennsylvania
Unincorporated communities in Pennsylvania